James Craigie (7 September 1851 – 17 August 1935) was Member of Parliament for the  electorate in the South Island of New Zealand and a member of the New Zealand Legislative Council. He was also Chairman of the South Canterbury Health Board, Chairman of the Timaru Harbour Board, a Timaru Borough Councillor and Mayor of Timaru.

Early life
Craigie was born in Coupar Angus, Perthshire, Scotland, on 7 September 1851.

He came to New Zealand in 1867 with his parents, James and Agnes Craigie (née McFarlane).

Craigie and his family landed in Dunedin, where he remained for several years after completing an apprenticeship as a painter and decorator.

Craigie married Catherine Orr from County Donegal, Ireland and they had six daughters and one son.

Move to Timaru

Craigie moved to Timaru in 1873 where he started a glass and house decoration business.  He also opened a large home decoration shop in Cains Terrace, Timaru.  He subsequently merged his business with a Dunedin firm and it became known as Smith & Craigie.  The merged business would ultimately become part of Smith & Smith, a company which continues to operate throughout New Zealand.

As his business success grew, Craigie purchased a large farm in Kingsdown, about 5 km south of Timaru, where he built a substantial house, Craigielea. Craigielea was subsequently destroyed by fire.

Craigie served on the South Canterbury Health Board for nine years, serving the last several years as Chairman.

He also served as Chairman of the Timaru Harbour Board for four years during which time significant progress was made in the development of the Port of Timaru.

Election to the Timaru Borough Council

Craigie was elected to the Timaru Borough Council in 1901.

Mayor of Timaru

Craigie was Mayor of Timaru for ten years from 1902 to 1913.

Member of Parliament

Independent Liberal
In the 1919 election, Craigie broke from the Liberal Party and stood as an Independent Liberal  or Progressive Liberal.

After retiring as a Member of Parliament Craigie was appointed to the Legislative Council on 1 June 1923. He served for one term until 31 May 1930 and was not re-appointed.

In 1935, Craigie was awarded the King George V Silver Jubilee Medal.

Admirer of Robert Burns

Craigie was an enthusiastic admirer of Robert Burns and was at one-time regarded as New Zealand's leading authority on Burns.

Craigie was an Overseas Vice President of the Robert Burns World Federation.

In 1931, Craigie delivered a lecture to the Wellington Burns Club entitled "The Humanity of Robert Burns".

Craigie provided funds for the erection in the Timaru Botanic Gardens of a statute of Robert Burns. The statue was unveiled by Craigie before a huge crowd on 28 May 1913.

Death

James Craigie died at his home Craigilea in Kingsdown, South Canterbury on 17 August 1935 due to “heart weakness”. He is buried in the Craigie Family Plot in Timaru Cemetery.

Legacy
Craigie was a generous benefactor to his adopted hometown of Timaru.

He provided the chimes for the Timaru Town Clock in 1913. This was initially hung in the Chief Post Office but in 1933 it was moved to the Timaru Council Building, which had been constructed during Craigie's tenure as Mayor.

Craigie provided the money for the oak trees planted in (what was to become known as) Craigie Avenue, Timaru now part of New Zealand State Highway 1. The double row of trees were planted on 12 October 1905. He also donated ten pounds for the building of the Catholic Sacred Heart Basilica, also located in Craigie Avenue, on 8 February 1910, the day the foundation stone for the church was laid.

In 1914 Craigie presented the renowned painting “The Mother” by Thomas Kennington to the South Canterbury Art Society. After his death, the Craigie family donated a C.F. Goldie painting "Memories. The Last of her Tribe” (painted in 1913) to the people of Timaru. Both paintings can be seen at the Aigantighe Art Gallery in Wai-iti Road, Timaru.

His descendants planted a tree in his honour in Craigie Avenue at Easter, 1994.

Notes

References

Substance of a lecture delivered at the inaugural meeting of the Wellington Burns Club, in the Concert Chamber, Town Hall, Wellington, February 25, 1931. [from Te Puna record]. Craigie was an authority on Burns

A Dictionary of New Zealand Biography, edited by G.H. Scholefield, Vol. 1, pp. 180–181, 1940, Department of Internal Affairs, Wellington

1851 births
1935 deaths
New Zealand Liberal Party MPs
Independent MPs of New Zealand
Members of the New Zealand Legislative Council
New Zealand businesspeople
New Zealand businesspeople in retailing
New Zealand farmers
Scottish emigrants to New Zealand
People from Timaru
Mayors of Timaru
Members of the New Zealand House of Representatives
New Zealand MPs for South Island electorates
People from Perthshire
Burials at Timaru Cemetery